Zunyi Maotai Airport  is an airport in Renhuai city, which is under the administration of the prefecture-level city of Zunyi in Guizhou Province, China.  It is located in Yinshui Village, Gaodaping Town,  from downtown Renhuai.  The airport is named after the famous Maotai liquor produced in the nearby town of the same name.  It is the second airport in Zunyi, after Zunyi Xinzhou Airport.

Construction
Preparation for building the airport began in 2000 and the site was chosen in 2003. Construction was originally scheduled to begin in 2006, but was delayed for five years until finally starting on December 25, 2011. Construction for the airport expressway also began on the same day. The airport cost 2.437 billion yuan to build. It was opened on 31 October 2017.

Facilities
The airport has a runway that is 2,600 meters long and 45 meters wide (class 4C), a 15,000 square-meter terminal building, and 4 aircraft parking aprons.

Airlines and destinations

See also
List of airports in China
List of the busiest airports in China

References

Airports in Guizhou
Airports established in 2017
Zunyi
2017 establishments in China